Ismael Sandor Espiga Coccolo (born 5 September 1978, in Carmelo) is a Uruguayan footballer who plays for Unión Comercio in the Peruvian Primera División.

External links
 Player profile 

1978 births
Living people
People from Carmelo, Uruguay
Uruguayan people of Spanish descent
Uruguayan footballers
Uruguayan expatriate footballers
Association football forwards
Montevideo Wanderers F.C. players
Juventud de Las Piedras players
Deportivo Maldonado players
Miramar Misiones players
C.A. Bella Vista players
Central Español players
Rampla Juniors players
Once Caldas footballers
C.D. Olmedo footballers
C.S.D. Macará footballers
Lobos BUAP footballers
Santiago Morning footballers
Universidad de Concepción footballers
Esporte Clube Juventude players
Unión Comercio footballers
Uruguayan Primera División players
Chilean Primera División players
Peruvian Primera División players
Expatriate footballers in Chile
Expatriate footballers in Argentina
Expatriate footballers in Colombia
Expatriate footballers in Ecuador
Expatriate footballers in Mexico
Expatriate footballers in Brazil
Expatriate footballers in Peru